Pesca is a town and municipality in the Colombian Department of Boyacá, part of the Sugamuxi Province, a subregion of Boyacá.

Notes 

Etymology 
In the Chibcha language of the Muisca, Pesca means "strong enclosure".

History 
Before the arrival of the Spanish in the 1530s, Pesca was part of the Muisca Confederation, a confederation of different rulers; zaques based in Hunza, zipas ruling from Muyquytá and caciques in other territories. Pesca was reigned by the iraca of sacred City of the Sun Sugamuxi, now called Sogamoso.

Modern Pesca was founded by Juan de Sanct Martín on December 20, 1548.

Economy 
Main economical activities in Pesca are agriculture (potatoes, maize, wheat, peas, beans and ibias) and livestock farming.

Born in Pesca 
 Víctor Herrera, former professional cyclist
 Miguel Ángel López, professional cyclist

References 

Municipalities of Boyacá Department
Populated places established in 1548
1548 establishments in the Spanish Empire
Muisca Confederation
Muysccubun